Earl of Antrim is a title that has been created twice, both times in the Peerage of Ireland and both times for members of the MacDonnell family, originally of Scottish origins.

History
The MacDonells of Antrim descended from Sorley Boy MacDonnell, who established the family in County Antrim. His fourth son Randal MacDonnell was created Viscount Dunluce, in the County of Antrim, in 1618, and Earl of Antrim in 1620. Both titles were in the Peerage of Ireland. His eldest son, the second Earl, fought as a Royalist in the Civil War and was created Marquess of Antrim in the Peerage of Ireland in 1645. He was childless and on his death in 1682 the marquessate became extinct.

He was succeeded in the viscountcy and earldom by his younger brother, the third Earl. He represented Wigan in the English House of Commons and also served as Lord Lieutenant of Antrim. Lord Antrim was attainted in 1689 for his support of King James II but was restored in 1697. His grandson, the fifth Earl, was Governor of County Antrim. He was succeeded by his son, the sixth Earl. He represented County Antrim in the Irish House of Commons. Lord Antrim had no sons, and as there were no other male heirs left of the first Earl, the titles were heading for extinction. However, in 1785 King George III created him Viscount Dunluce and Earl of Antrim in the Peerage of Ireland, with remainder to his daughters in order of seniority and the heirs male of their bodies. In 1789 he was further honoured when he was made Marquess of Antrim in the Peerage of Ireland, with normal remainder to the heirs male of his body.

On Lord Antrim's death in 1791 the viscountcy of Dunluce of 1618, the earldom of Antrim of 1620 and the marquessate became extinct. He was succeeded in the viscountcy and earldom of 1785 according to the special remainders by his eldest daughter Anne Catherine, the second holder of the titles. She married as her first husband Sir Henry Vane-Tempest, 2nd Baronet, of Long Newton. Their daughter Lady Frances Anne Vane-Tempest married Charles William Vane, 3rd Marquess of Londonderry, and was the great-grandmother of Prime Minister Sir Winston Churchill. Lady Antrim had no sons and was succeeded by her younger sister Charlotte, the third holder. She was the wife of Vice Admiral Lord Mark Robert Kerr, third son of William John Kerr, 5th Marquess of Lothian.

She was succeeded by her eldest surviving son, the fourth Earl. He assumed in 1836 by Royal licence the surname of McDonnell in lieu of Kerr. He had no sons and was succeeded by his younger brother, the fifth Earl. On succeeding his brother in 1855, he too assumed by Royal licence the surname of McDonnell in lieu of Kerr.  the titles are held by his great-great-great-grandson, the tenth Earl, who succeeded his father in that year. As a male-line descendant of the 5th Marquess of Lothian, he is also in remainder to that Scottish peerage and its subsidiary titles.

Angus McDonnell (1881–1966), second son of the sixth Earl of the second creation, was Member of Parliament for Dartford.

The family seat is Glenarm Castle, near Glenarm, County Antrim, in Northern Ireland.

The Dunluce Cup is awarded at the Larne Music Festival by the Viscount or Viscountess Dunluce, heir to the Earl of Antrim.

The McQuillan family held Dunluce before the McDonnells, but they were overthrown during the 1500s and were not granted any peerage.

List of Earls and Marquesses

Earls of Antrim, first creation (1620)
Randal MacDonnell, 1st Earl of Antrim (died 1636)
Randal MacDonnell, 2nd Earl of Antrim (1609–1682) (created Marquess of Antrim in 1645)

Marquesses of Antrim, first creation (1645)
Randal MacDonnell, 1st Marquess of Antrim (1609–1682)

Earls of Antrim, first creation (1620; reverted)
Alexander MacDonnell, 3rd Earl of Antrim (1615–1699) (forfeit 1689; restored 1697)
Randal MacDonnell, 4th Earl of Antrim (1680–1721)
Alexander MacDonnell, 5th Earl of Antrim (1713–1775)
Randal William MacDonnell, 6th Earl of Antrim (1749–1791) (created Earl of Antrim in 1785 and Marquess of Antrim in 1789)

Marquesses of Antrim, second creation (1789)
Randal William MacDonnell, 1st Marquess of Antrim (1749–1791)

Earls of Antrim, second creation (1785)
Randal William MacDonnell, 1st Marquess of Antrim, 1st Earl of Antrim (1749–1791)
Anne Catherine MacDonnell, 2nd Countess of Antrim (1775–1834)
Charlotte Kerr, 3rd Countess of Antrim (1779–1835)
Hugh Seymour McDonnell, 4th Earl of Antrim (1812–1855)
Mark McDonnell, 5th Earl of Antrim (1814–1869)
William Randal McDonnell, 6th Earl of Antrim (1851–1918)
Randal Mark Kerr McDonnell, 7th Earl of Antrim (1878–1932)
Randal John Somerled McDonnell, 8th Earl of Antrim (1911–1977)
Alexander Randal Mark McDonnell, 9th Earl of Antrim (1935–2021)
Randal Alexander McDonnell, 10th Earl of Antrim (born 1967)

The heir apparent is the son of the present Earl, Alexander David Somerled McDonnell, Viscount Dunluce (born 2006).

Arms

See also
Marquess of Lothian
Glenarm Castle
Dunaneeny Castle

Notes

References

Kidd, Charles, Williamson, David (editors). Debrett's Peerage and Baronetage (1990 edition). New York: St Martin's Press, 1990,

External links
Cracroft's Peerage page

Earldoms in the Peerage of Ireland
Extinct earldoms in the Peerage of Ireland
Peerages created with special remainders
Noble titles created in 1620
Noble titles created in 1785
County Antrim